Phillip Matsapole Pogiso Modise (born 5 May 1982) is a South African politician and a Member of Parliament for the African National Congress. He was elected to parliament in 2019.

Since becoming an MP, Modise has sat on the Portfolio Committee on Environment, Forestry and Fisheries. He was an alternate member of the  Portfolio Committee on Sports, Arts and Culture between June 2019 and August 2021.

References

External links
Profile at Parliament of South Africa
Profile at ANC Parliamentary Caucus

Living people
1982 births
People from Gauteng
African National Congress politicians
Members of the National Assembly of South Africa